Tauykhabl is a rural locality (an aul) in Dzhidzhikhablskoye Rural Settlement of Teuchezhsky District, the Republic of Adygea, Russia. The population was 197 as of 2018. There are 5 streets.

Geography 
Tauykhabl is located 14 km north of Ponezhukay (the district's administrative centre) by road. Dzhidzhikhabl is the nearest rural locality.

References 

Rural localities in Teuchezhsky District